Ryan McDonald may refer to:

 Ryan MacDonald (author) (born 1977), American writer, sound and visual artist
 Ryan MacDonald (rugby league), English rugby league player
 Ryan McDonald (American actor) (1930-2020), American actor
 Ryan McDonald (Canadian actor) (born 1984), Canadian actor
 Ryan McDonald (American football) (born 1985), American football center

See also
 Ran McDonald (1889–1950), Canadian professional ice hockey player